The San Lorenzo mouse (Peromyscus interparietalis) is a species of rodent in the family Cricetidae. It is endemic to Mexico, where it is found only from the islands of San Lorenzo Norte, San Lorenzo Sur, and Salsipuedes off the east coast of Baja California. The species is threatened by predation by feral and domestic cats, particularly on San Lorenzo Sur.

References

Peromyscus
Endemic mammals of Mexico
Endemic fauna of the Baja California Peninsula
Rodents of North America
Fauna of Gulf of California islands
Mammals described in 1932
Critically endangered biota of Mexico
Critically endangered fauna of North America
Taxonomy articles created by Polbot